A special election to the United States House of Representatives for North Carolina's 10th congressional district was held November 4, 1986.

The winning candidate would serve briefly in the United States House of Representatives to represent North Carolina in the 99th Congress until the General election on January 03, 1987, however Cass Ballenger won the general election for the seat which occurred on the same day as the special election to win election to a full 2-year term until January 03, 1989.

Background 
On July 14, 1986, Incumbent U.S. Representative Jim Broyhill retired after being appointed by then-Governor of North Carolina James G. Martin to the United States Senate succeeding the late-U.S. Senator John Porter East, who died of suicide. A special election was held to fill the vacancy caused by his appointment.

Democratic Primary

Candidates

Nominee 
Lester D. Roark, former Shelby Mayor and City Council member

Eliminated in Primary 
Jack L. Rhyne, nominee for this seat in 1974
Ted A. Poovey, candidate for this seat in 1984
Denny R. Hickman
Steve Dolley Jr., lawyer

Results

Republican Primary

Candidates

Nominee 
 Cass Ballenger, former state senator (1977-1985) and former state representative (1975-1977)

Eliminated in Primary 
George S. Robinson, state representative (1980-1986)
W. Hall Young, perennial candidate

Results

General election

See also 
 United States House of Representatives elections, 1982
 United States House of Representatives elections, 1984

References 

North Carolina 1986 10
North Carolina 1986 10
1986 10 Special
North Carolina 10 Special
United States House of Representatives 10 Special
United States House of Representatives 1986 10